Brookdale is a census-designated place (CDP) in Santa Cruz County, California. It is located in the San Lorenzo Valley between Boulder Creek and Ben Lomond on Highway 9. The 2010 United States census reported Brookdale's population was 1,991.

The ZIP Code is 95007 and the community is inside area code 831.  There is no mail delivery in Brookdale, though no home is more than 1.5 miles from the post office.

History
The area was previously known as Clear Creek and then Brookville, and was the site of the Grover Lumber Mill by 1870. Logging and lumber was the major industry throughout the Santa Cruz Mountains at the time. James Harvey Logan, a Santa Cruz judge and creator of the loganberry, purchased the mill in 1900, created a creekside resort with cabins and camping, and established the Brookdale post office in 1902.

The Brookdale Lodge
Brookdale Lodge, a historic resort complex, is the main business in Brookdale. It was famous for decades, known especially for the stream running through its primary restaurant, the Brook Room (closed for renovation as of 2019). It currently has a reputation for being haunted by numerous ghosts. Started by Judge Logan, by 1922 it was owned by Dr. F. K. Camp, a Seventh-day Adventist physician, who envisioned a dining room spanning the creek and hired Horace Cotton of San Francisco to design it.

In its day, the Brookdale Lodge was the second most popular resort in California and hosted the rich and famous ... Hollywood stars, prominent families, foreign diplomats, and even President Herbert Hoover visited the scenic lodge. Famous persons passing through Brookdale Lodge included: Mae West, Marilyn Monroe, Tyrone Power, Joan Crawford, Rita Hayworth, Hedy Lamarr, and President Herbert Hoover. Shirley Temple and Johnny Weissmuller had homes nearby. Herbert Hoover visited often, and enjoyed fishing off the dining room bridge. And during the San Francisco conference establishing the United Nations, world leaders and diplomats came to the lodge to relax. The lodge was also famous for its first rate entertainment, attracting the best big band and swing groups of the era. There are at least three swing era songs written about the Brookdale including, My Brookdale Hideaway, A Place Known as Brookdale, and Beautiful Brookdale Lodge.

The lodge has changed hands many times since, and was condemned after a fire in 2009. Since 2016 it has been owned by Pravin and Naina Patel. The lodge appeared on the paranormal show Ghost Adventures in 2012. The property has once again been sold and is undergoing intensive renovations.

Fires
There have been three large fires at the Lodge, the last of suspicious origin. 

The first occurred on October 24, 1956. In that fire the dining room and an adjoining 12-room house were destroyed. A group of stores adjacent to the dining room were also badly damaged. Damage from the 1956 fire was estimated at $200,000. 

The second occurred in 2005 in the same area of the main hotel as the 2009 fire.

On August 18, 2009, a fire engulfed a two-story section of the lodge near the rear of the main building that contains apartments mostly occupied by lodge employees. There were no reports of injuries to anybody staying at the inn, though some firefighters suffered minor injuries while fighting the blaze.

The origin of the fire is still under investigation and the U.S. Bureau of Alcohol, Tobacco, Firearms and Explosives is helping to determine the cause of the three-alarm fire. According to the Boulder Creek Fire Chief the fire started under suspicious circumstances.

Geography
According to the United States Census Bureau, the CDP covers an area of 3.8 square miles (10.0 km2), all of it land.

Climate
This region experiences warm (but not hot) and dry summers, with no average monthly temperatures above 71.6 °F.  According to the Köppen Climate Classification system, Brookdale has a warm-summer Mediterranean climate, abbreviated "Csb" on climate maps.

Demographics

The 2010 United States Census reported that Brookdale had a population of 1,991. The racial makeup of Brookdale was 1,790 (89.9%) White, 9 (0.5%) African American, 12 (0.6%) Native American, 19 (1.0%) Asian, 8 (0.4%) Pacific Islander, 66 (3.3%) from other races, and 87 (4.4%) from two or more races. Hispanic or Latino of any race were 202 persons (10.1%).

The census reported that 100% of the population lived in households.

There were 806 households, out of which 235 (29.2%) had children under the age of 18 living in them, 352 (43.7%) were opposite-sex married couples living together, 75 (9.3%) had a female householder with no husband present, 43 (5.3%) had a male householder with no wife present.  There were 75 (9.3%) unmarried opposite-sex partnerships, and 8 (1.0%) same-sex married couples or partnerships. 242 households (30.0%) were made up of individuals, and 44 (5.5%) had someone living alone who was 65 years of age or older. The average household size was 2.47.  There were 470 families (58.3% of all households); the average family size was 3.09.

The population was spread out, with 425 people (21.3%) under the age of 18, 155 people (7.8%) aged 18 to 24, 494 people (24.8%) aged 25 to 44, 751 people (37.7%) aged 45 to 64, and 166 people (8.3%) who were 65 years of age or older.  The median age was 42.3 years. For every 100 females, there were 104.8 males.  For every 100 females age 18 and over, there were 103.9 males.

The homeowner vacancy rate was 1.4%; the rental vacancy rate was 4.8%. 65.4% of the population lived in owner-occupied housing units and 34.6% lived in rental housing units.

References

Census-designated places in Santa Cruz County, California
Census-designated places in California